Cross Canada Barndance was a Canadian television variety show, which aired on CTV during that network's inaugural season in 1961–62.

Produced by Sydney Banks and hosted by Evan Kemp, the show aired live performances by country musicians taped at various CTV affiliate stations. The show aired Saturday nights at 11 p.m. beginning October 1961 as one of CTV's inaugural series.

References

External links

 Cross Canada Barndance at Canadian Communications Foundation
 

1960s Canadian music television series
1960s Canadian variety television series
CTV Television Network original programming
1961 Canadian television series debuts
1962 Canadian television series endings
Country music television series